The 2007 Big West Conference men's basketball tournament was held March 7–10 at Anaheim Convention Center in Anaheim, California.

Long Beach State defeated  in the championship game, 94–83, to obtain the fourth Big West Conference men's basketball tournament championship in school history.

The 49ers earned the conference's automatic bid to the 2006 NCAA tournament as the #12 seed in the San Antonio region.

Format

All eight teams in the conference participated. Teams were seeded based on regular season conference records. The top four seeds received byes, with the top two seeds receiving a second bye into the semifinal round.

Bracket

References

Big West Conference men's basketball tournament
Tournament
Big West Conference men's basketball tournament
Big West Conference men's basketball tournament